Ricardo Andrés Soto Pedraza (born 20 October 1999) is a Chilean recurve archer from Concepción. In 2009, he moved to Arica. He competed in the archery event at the 2016 Summer Olympics in Rio de Janeiro.

Career

2016 Summer Olympics
At the 2016 Summer Olympics in Rio de Janeiro Soto finished his ranking round with a total of 675 points, which gave him the 13th seed for the final competition bracket in which he faced Anton Prylepau in the Round of 64, he won the match 5(29)–5(27). He played Bernardo Oliveira in the Round of 32, winning the match 7–1. In the Round of 16 he played Sjef van den Berg, losing the match 5–6.

Olympic results

References

External links
 

Chilean male archers
Living people
Place of birth missing (living people)
1999 births
Archers at the 2016 Summer Olympics
Olympic archers of Chile
South American Games silver medalists for Chile
South American Games medalists in archery
Competitors at the 2018 South American Games
Competitors at the 2022 South American Games
Archers at the 2019 Pan American Games
Pan American Games medalists in archery
Pan American Games silver medalists for Chile
Medalists at the 2019 Pan American Games
People from Concepción, Chile
21st-century Chilean people